Henriettella is a genus of plants in the family Melastomataceae.

Species include:
 Henriettella goudotiana Naudin
 Henriettella ininiensis Wurdack
 Henriettella odorata Markgr.

 
Melastomataceae genera
Taxonomy articles created by Polbot